William Cockburn  was an Anglican priest in Ireland in the eighteenth  century.

Cockburn was born in Kilkenny. He entered Trinity College, Dublin in 1739 and graduated B.A. in 1743; LL.B. in 1747; and LL.D in 1759.  Cockburne was Prebendary of   Mayne in Kilkenny Cathedral from 1758 to 1762; and  Archdeacon of Ossory from 1762 to 1776.

References

Alumni of Trinity College Dublin
Archdeacons of Ossory
People from Kilkenny (city)